KAM Manufacturing is a handbag manufacturer located in Van Wert, Ohio, USA. Founded in 1988 by Kim Adams, the company has been in business for more than 25 years. The company's factory was destroyed by a tornado in 2002. The company produced handbags for Vera Bradley until ending its relationship with Vera Bradley Designs in 2008, when the company announced it would lay off 140 employees and possibly discontinue operations by the end of the year. The company instead established the Stephanie Dawn brand that year. KAM was named small business of the year in Van Wert County in 2006 and was awarded a Blue Ribbon by the U.S. Chamber of Commerce.

Retailers carrying Stephanie Dawn include the Artists’ Colony in Northeast Ohio and Kristina's Gifts in Waynesburg, Ohio. as well as Karen's Gifts in New Port Richey, Florida. Stephanie Dawn sponsored "The Art of Fiber" exhibition at the Wassenberg Art Center in January 2011.

References

External links
Stephanie Dawn website

Companies established in 1988
Companies based in Ohio
Van Wert, Ohio